Jackson Diehl (born 1956) was the deputy editorial page editor of The Washington Post from February, 2001 to August, 2021. He was part of the Washington Post team that won the 2022 Pulitzer Prize in Public Service. He wrote many of the paper's editorials on foreign affairs, helped to oversee the editorial and op-ed pages and authored a regular column. He is a member of the Council on Foreign Relations and can speak two foreign languages, Spanish and Polish.

Diehl was born in San Antonio, Texas.  He received a B.A. from Yale College in 1978.

Career
Diehl joined The Washington Post as a reporter in 1978. From 1982 to 1992, he worked at the paper's foreign bureaus in Buenos Aires, Warsaw and Jerusalem. He was foreign editor and assistant managing editor for foreign news from 1992 to 1999, and oversaw the expansion of The Washington Posts foreign staff. In 1999, he became assistant managing editor for national news and oversaw coverage of the 2000 presidential election campaign.

As an editor and columnist, Diehl favored the 2003 invasion of Iraq under the George W. Bush administration. Diehl had advocated for democratic reforms and a tougher U.S. policy toward Egypt, criticizing Barack Obama for his "dangerous passivity," and in 2011 he was a Finalist for the Pulitzer Prize for Editorial Writing, for his commentary on Egypt.

Coverage of Venezuela 
In Jan of 2010, Diehl criticized Venezuelan President Hugo Chavez and the Bolivarian Revolution and wrote that "Chavez's socialism for the 21st century" had been defeated "and is on its way to collapse."

In October 2011, Diehl, in his opinion column, Obama's policy on Venezuela leaves Chavez's victims paying price, criticized the Obama administration over their foot-dragging, in granting asylum for Nelson Mezerhane. Mezerhane, who had been threatened by Chavez, to stifle Globolvision's network coverage criticizing Chavez, had fled Venezuela, after he and his family faced threats to their lives. Diehl noted in his column, that asylum decisions should be nonpolitical, but under Hillary Clinton's State Department, a strategy of avoiding "scrapes" with Chavez, left people like Mezerhane danger. In his column he wrote:

Diehl was also critical of the Trump administration's handling of Venezuelan President Nicolás Maduro, saying of Trump's foreign policy, in his column in January 2020:

2012 Syria coverage
Diehl was nominated for the 2013 Pulitzer Prize for Editorial Writing; in the cover letter, nominating Jackson Diehl for the Prize, Fred Hiatt wrote:

The series of editorial columns, that resulted in Diehl becoming a finalist for the prize, are listed below.

 Time to lead on Syria, March 8, 2012
 An unworkable plan for Syria, March 23, 2012
 Needed: Plan B for Syria, April 22, 2012
 The U.N.'s monitors of death, April 26, 2012
 As Syria burns, May 11, 2012
 Who will stop Syria's massacres?, May 30, 2012
 What to do in Syria, June 1, 2012
 Scapegoat for Syria, July 1, 2012
 Syria's hard core, August 9, 2012
 Impotent on Syria, December 31, 2012

Awards and recognition
During his career, Diehl has received multiple awards as listed below.

 1984 Inter-American Press Association Award for Interpretive Journalism, for his coverage of South America
 1989  Bob Considine Award of the Overseas Press Association, for his coverage of the 1989 revolution in Eastern Europe.
 2011 Finalist for the 2011 Pulitzer Prize for Editorial Writing, for his commentary on Egypt
 2013 Finalist for the Pulitzer Prize finalist, for editorials about Syria.
 2018 The Eugene Meyer and Ben Bradlee Award, for extraordinary journalism 
 2019 Journalist of the Year Award by the Algemeiner Foundation
 2022 He was part of the team that won the 2022 Pulitzer Prize in Public Service

References

External links 

 Jackson Diehl - Author Archive

Living people
1956 births
The Washington Post people
Yale College alumni
Writers from San Antonio
American male journalists
20th-century American journalists